The economy of the Ming dynasty (1368–1644) of China was the largest in the world during that period. It is regarded as one of China's three major golden ages (the other two being the Han and Tang periods). The period was marked by the increasing political influence of the merchants, the gradual weakening of imperial rule, and technological advances.

Currency 

The early Ming dynasty attempted to use paper currency, with outflows of bullion limited by its ban on private foreign commerce. Like its forebears, the currency experienced massive counterfeiting and hyperinflation. (In 1425, Ming notes were trading at about 0.014% of its original value under the Hongwu Emperor.) The notes remained in circulation as late as 1573 but their printing was ended in 1450. Minor coins were minted in base metals, but trade mostly occurred using silver ingots. As their purity and exact weight varied, they were treated as bullion and measured in tael. These privately made "sycee" first came into use in Guangdong, spreading to the lower Yangtze sometime before 1423, the year it became acceptable for payment of tax obligations. In the mid-15th century, the paucity of circulating silver caused a monetary contraction and extensive reversion to barter. The problem was met through smuggled, then legal, importation of Japanese silver (mostly through the Portuguese and Dutch) and Spanish silver from Potosí carried on the Manila galleons. Provincial taxes were required to be paid in silver in 1465; the salt tax, in 1475; and corvée exemptions, in 1485. By the late Ming, the amount of silver being used was extraordinary: at a time when English traders considered tens of thousands of pounds an exceptional fortune, the Zheng clan of merchants regularly engaged in transactions valued at millions of taels. However, a second silver contraction occurred in the mid-17th century when  began enforcing laws limiting direct trade between Spanish South America and China at about the same time the new Tokugawa shogunate in Japan restricted most of its foreign exports, cutting off Dutch and Portuguese access to its silver. The dramatic spike in silver's value in China made payment of taxes nearly impossible for most provinces. In extremis, the government even resumed use of paper currency amid Li Zicheng's rebellion.

Manufactures

Privatization
Another key feature of the Ming manufacturing industry was privatization. Unlike the Song, in which state-owned enterprises played a large role, the Ming reverted to the old laissez faire policies of the Han by privatizing the salt and tea industries. By the middle of the Ming dynasty, powerful groups of wealthy merchants had replaced the state as the dominant movers behind Chinese industry.

Emergence of wage labor
The Ming government abolished the mandatory forced labor by peasants used in early dynasties and replaced it with wage labor. A new class of wage laborers sprung up where none had existed before. In Jingde alone, it was reported that there were no less than 300 pottery factories, all operated by wage laborers.

Early encouragement of agriculture under Hongwu Emperor

In order to recover from the wars during the late Yuan dynasty, the Hongwu Emperor enacted pro-agricultural policies. The state invested extensively in agricultural canals, reduced taxes on agriculture to 1/30 of the output, and later to 1.5% of agricultural output. Ming farmers also introduced many innovations such as water-powered plows, and new agricultural methods such as crop rotation. This led to a massive agricultural surplus that became the basis of a market economy.

Emergence of commercial plantations

The Ming saw the rise of commercial plantations who produced crops suitable to their regions. 
Tea, fruits, paint and other goods were produced on a massive scale by these agricultural plantations. Regional patterns of production established during this period continued into the Qing dynasty. The Columbian exchange brought crops such as corn with these foreign crops. During the, specialized areas also popped up planting large numbers of cash crops that could be sold at markets. Large numbers of peasants abandoned the land to become artisans. The population of the Ming boomed; estimates for the population of the Ming range from 160 to 200 million.

Rural markets during the Ming

Ming agriculture was much changed from the earlier areas; firstly, gigantic areas, devoting and specializing in cash crops, sprung up to demand from the new market economy. Secondly, agricultural tools and carts, some water-powered, help to create a gigantic agricultural surplus which formed the basis of the rural economy. Besides rice, other crops were grown on a large scale.

Although images of autarkic farmers who had no connection to the rest of China may have some merit for the earlier Han and T'ang dynasties, this was certainly not the case for the Ming dynasty. During the Ming dynasty, the increase in population and the decrease in quality land made it necessary that farmers make a living off cash crops. Many of these markets appeared in the rural countryside, where goods were exchanged and bartered.

A second type of market that developed in China was the urban-rural type, in which rural goods were sold to urban dwellers. This was particular the case when landlords decided to reside in the cities, and use income coming from rural land holding to facilitate exchange in the cities.
Another way this type of market was used was professional merchants who bought rural goods in large quantities.

The third type of market was the "national market" which was developed during the Song dynasty but particularly enhanced during the Ming. This market involved not only the exchange described above, but also products produced directly for the market. Unlike earlier dynasties, many Ming peasants were no longer producing only products they needed; many of them produced products for the market, which then they sold at a profit.

Trade and investment

In the early Ming, after the devastation of the war which expelled the Mongols, the Hongwu Emperor imposed severe restrictions on trade (the "haijin"). Believing that agriculture was the basis of the economy, Hongwu favored that industry over all else, including that of merchants. After his death, most of his policies were reversed by his successors. By the late Ming, the state was losing power to the very merchants which Hongwu had wanted to restrict.

The Ming dynasty also engaged in a thriving trade with both Europe and Japan. The amount of silver flowing into the Ming dynasty was estimated by Joseph Needham at 300 million taels, which is equivalent to more than 190 billion dollars in today's money. In addition to silver, the Ming also imported many European firearms, in order to ensure the modernness of their weapons.

Trade and commerce thrived in this liberalized economy, and was aided by the construction of canals, roads, and bridges by the Ming government. The Ming saw the rise of several merchant clans such as the Huai and Jin clans, who disposed of large amounts of wealth. The gentry and merchant classes started to fuse, and the merchants gained power at the expense of the state. Some merchants were reputed to have a treasure of 30 million taels.

China acted as the cog running the wheel of global trade. Trade with Japan continued unobstructed despite the embargo, through Chinese smugglers, Southeast Asian ports, or Portuguese. China was entirely integrated in the world trading system.

European nations had a great desire for Chinese goods such as silk and porcelain. The Europeans did not have any goods or commodities which China desired, so they traded silver to make up for their trade deficit. Spaniards at the time of the Age of Exploration discovered vast amounts of silver, much of which was from the Potosí silver mines, to fuel their trade economy. Spanish American silver mines were the world's cheapest sources of it, producing 40,000 tons of silver in 200 years. The ultimate destination for the mass amounts of silver produced in the Americas and Japan was China. From 1500 to 1800, Mexico and Peru produced about 80% of the world's silver with 30% of it eventually ending up in China.  In the late 16th and early 17th century, Japan was also exporting silver heavily into China. Silver from the Americas flowed mostly across the Atlantic and made its way to the far east. Major outposts for the silver trade were located in Southeast Asian countries, such as the Philippines. The city of Manila served as a primary outpost of the exchange of goods between the Americas, Japan, Indian, Indonesia and China. However, there was a large amount of silver that crossed across the Pacific Ocean directly from the Americas as well.

Trade with Ming China via Manila served a major source of revenue for the Spanish Empire and as a fundamental source of income for Spanish colonists in the Philippine Islands. Until 1593, two or more ships would set sail annually from each port. The galleon trade was supplied by merchants largely from port areas of Fujian who traveled to Manila to sell the Spaniards spices, porcelain, ivory, lacquerware, processed silk cloth and other valuable commodities. Cargoes varied from one voyage to another but often included goods from all over Asia - jade, wax, gunpowder and silk from China; amber, cotton and rugs from India; spices from Indonesia and Malaysia; and a variety of goods from Japan, including fans, chests, screens and porcelain.

Taxation

Ming taxation was light. Taxes on agriculture were only 1/30 of agricultural produce, and were later reduced to 1/50 of produce. Taxes on commerce amounted to 1/30 of commerce also, but was later reduced to 1.5%. These low taxes spurred trade, but severely weakened the state. Salt, as in earlier dynasties, was an important source of state revenue, but required constant and competent management. With the coming of the Little Ice Age in the 17th century, the state's low revenues and its inability to raise taxes caused massive deficits, and large numbers of Ming troops defected or rebelled because they had not been paid.

Weakening of the state
During the Ming, the controls imposed on the economy were gradually relaxed. State monopolies on salt and iron ended as these and other industries were privatized. Taxes were reduced from the high levels under the Mongol Yuan, and the Ming had one of the lowest tax rates (per person) in the world. The entire foreign trade, which was estimated at up to 300 million taels, provided the Ming with a tax of only about 40,000 taels a year. When the Wanli Emperor sought to increase the salt tax, his measures were opposed by violence and the eunuchs he sent to collect the tax were beheaded by local officials.

Sprouts of capitalism

Investment and capital moved off the land and were poured into ventures. Continuing the trend from the Song, Ming investors poured large amounts of capital into ventures and reaped high profits. Many Chinese scholars believe the Ming was the dynasty in which the "sprouts of capitalism" emerged in China, only to be suppressed by the Qing Dynasty. This theory was widely promoted by Communist scholars during the Maoist period, and suffers from that period's general condemnation of the Manchu Qing, who were accused of mis-managing the Chinese state in the face of foreign encroachment.

See also
Economic history of China
Economy of the Han dynasty
Economy of the Song dynasty

References

External links
China’s GDP in the Ming Dynasty Guan Hanhui David Daokui Li

Ming dynasty
Economic history of China
Medieval economics
16th-century economic history
17th-century economic history